John Fahey Visits Washington D.C. is an album by American fingerstyle guitarist and composer John Fahey, released in 1979.

History
John Fahey Visits Washington D.C. was Fahey's first album in four years. The same year,  he sold Takoma, the independent record label he had started in 1959, to Chrysalis Records. Chrysalis eventually sold the rights to the albums, and Takoma was in limbo until bought by Fantasy Records in 1995. He cited the strain of running the label and its lack of direction as reasons for selling it to the UK-based company. Other sources refer to Fahey's disinterest in the business side of running Takoma, the company's debt, and the current poor business climate of the record industry.

He covers two songs by other guitarists – "Guitar Lamento" is by Brazilian guitarist Bola Sete from his album Ocean and "Death by Reputation" by Leo Kottke from his eponymous 1977 album.

It was rumored that an entire album known as the Nuthouse sessions was rejected, leading to the release of John Fahey Visits Washington D.C. instead.

Reception

Music critic Richie Unterberger praised the album, noting the "stellar picking and an eclectic range of influences... Some of his characteristic moodiness emerges in passages from 'Ann Arbor' and 'Melody McBad'."

From his review for the UK-based Record Collector, critic Sid Smith gave the album 4 stars, writing "... although the landscape may look and sound familiar, nothing is quite what it seems. Circuitous, complex lines are unfurled into rare, blooming chords in much the way a magician pulls flowers out of his pocket. However, it’s the gothic rumbles of "Guitar Lamento" that remind us how Fahey’s use of space and haunting repetition created glorious epic moods tempered with a bleak intensity that still resonates."

Reissues
John Fahey Visits Washington D.C. was reissued on CD in 2008 by Ace Records.

Track listing
 "Medley: Silver Bell/Cheyenne" (Fahey, Doc Watson, Bill Monroe) – 4:31  
 "Ann Arbor/Death by Reputation" (Fahey, Leo Kottke) – 8:11  
 "The Discovery of the Sylvia Scott" (Fahey) – 7:45  
 "Guitar Lamento" (Bola Sete) – 5:49  
 "Melody McBad" (Fahey) – 10:09  
 "The Grand Finale" (Fahey) – 7:05

Personnel
John Fahey – guitar
Richard Ruskin – guitar (on "Medley")
Production notes
John Fahey – liner notes
Tom Davis – engineer
Rob Shread – mastering
Michael Boshears – remixing, mastering
Dee Westlund – art direction
Murry Whiteman – design
John Van Hamersveld – design, illustrations
Kris Needs – liner notes

References

External links
The Fahey Files notes on the songs.

1979 albums
John Fahey (musician) albums
Takoma Records albums